DSVII (short for Digital Shades Vol. II) is the eighth studio album by French electronic music band M83, released on 20 September 2019 through Naïve and Mute Records. It is a sequel album to Digital Shades Vol. 1, released in 2007.

Background
Anthony Gonzalez said the album was inspired by playing 1980s video games while in Cap d'Antibes in France in 2017, calling the "old-school games" "naive and touching" as well as "simple and imperfect". He was also inspired by the soundtracks of science fiction and fantasy films of the decade, as well as the synthesizer music of Suzanne Ciani, Mort Garson, Brian Eno and John Carpenter.

Recording
Gonzalez recorded the album between 2017 and 2018 using only analog equipment, splitting sessions between both his Los Angeles studio and producer Justin Meldal-Johnsen's studio in Glendale, California. Band member Kaela Sinclair contributed vocals and arrangements.

Critical reception

At Metacritic, which assigns a weighted average score out of 100 to reviews from critics, the album earned a score of 68, indicating "generally favorable reviews".

Track listing

Personnel

M83
 Anthony Gonzalez – keyboard, synthesizer, guitar, bass guitar, vocals, producer, programming, arranging, mixing, drum machine, drum pads
 Joe Berry – piano, synthesizers, saxophones, flute, winds, pedal steel, accordion, co-production, string arrangements
 Kaela Sinclair – vocals, vocal arrangements

Additional musicians
 Justin Meldal-Johnsen – keyboard, synthesizer, guitar, production, programmer, arranging, mixing

Charts

References

2019 albums
M83 (band) albums
Mute Records albums